This is a list of the trading posts and settlements of the Dutch West India Company (active 1621–1791), including chronological details of possessions taken over from the Dutch state in 1621, and for the period after 1791 when the Dutch government took over responsibility again.

The list runs in geographical sequence from north to south along the West African coast and from north to south through the Americas.

West Africa

Mauritania
 Arguin (1633–1678 / 1724–1728)
 Portendick

Senegal
Portudal
Rufisque
Joal
Gorée(Dutch: Goeree island' (1617–1663 / 24 October 1664 – 1677))

Sierra Leone
Tasso Island (1664; destroyed by Admiral De Ruyter)

Liberia
Cape Mount

Ghana (Dutch Gold Coast)
1611–1872
Cape Apollonia (Benyin): Fort Apollonia (16.-1768 / 1868–1872) to the English.
Abacqua (Duma or Egwira): Fort Ruychaver (Jul./Aug. 1654 – 1659)
Mouth of Ankobra: Fort Elize Carthago (1650)
Axim: Fort Santo Antonio (February 1642 – 1664 / 1665 – 1872)
 Pokesu or Princess Town (old Dutch spelling: Poquesoe): Fort Hollandia (formerly fort Gross Friedrichsburg)  1725 fort - 1814/1815 abandoned/1687* - 1698/1711 – 1712/1732 - 1804 abandoned
Dixcove: Fort Metalen Kruis (1868–1872)
Butri: Fort Batenstein (1656-1665 / 166..–1872)
Takoradi:  Fort Witsen
British Sekondi: 1782–1785; 1868–1872.
Dutch Sekondi:  Fort Oranje, 1640 or 1670/75–1872.
Shama:  Fort St. Sebastiaan 1637-1664  / 1664–1872
British Komenda: Fort Komenda (1868–1872)
Dutch Komenda: Fort Vredenburgh (1688 fort – 1782 / 1785–1872)
Elmina: Castle St. George d'Elmina, Fort Coenraadsburg on St. Jago Hill, Redoubt De Veer (1810/1811), Redoubt Naglas (1828), Redoubt Java (1828), Redoubt Schomarus (1828), Redoubt Batenstein (1828). (28/29 August 1637 – 6 April 1872)
Cape Coast Castle, Cabo Corço or Oguaa (Swedish name: Carolusborg or Carlsborg) (16 April 1659.- May 1659/ 22 April 1663. - 3 May 1664 **Cong (Cong Height):  - 1659 abandoned / 1661 Danish Fort destroyed by the Dutch)
Moree: Fort Nassau (1624) (1598 or 1611 / 12 – 1664/1665 – 1782/1785 – 1867 by treaty to the English)
Cormantin: Fort Amsterdam (1665 � 1721 / 1785–1867 by treaty to the English)
Anomabu: (1640–1652)
Egya: (1647– ? / 1663–1664)
Apam: Fort Leydsaemheyt or Lijdzaamheid (Patience) (1697/1698 � 1782/ 1785–1868)
Senya Beraku: Fort Goede Hoop, (1667 or 1705/06 fort � 1782/1785 – 1867/68)
Ussher Town (Accra): Fort Cr�vecoeur (1649–1782/ 1786–1868)
Kpone: (1697 - Apr. 1700 / 1706– ?)
Keta: Fort Singelenburgh  (? - 1737)
Kumase: (1837–1842 / 1848–1853 / 1859–1869)

Togo
Petit Popo or Popo / (Anecho or Aneho) (1731–1760)

Benin (Dutch Slave Coast)
Great Popo(1680– ?)
Ouidah (1670s. or 1687 / 1702-1724 or 1726)
Jaquim or Jakri (Godomey)  Fort Zelandia	(1726–1734)
Offra(1675–1691)
Appa or Ekp�(1732–1736)
Savi
Allada or Ardra

Nigeria
Benin  (1705–1736)
Badagri  (1737–1748)
Epe  (1732–1755)

West Central Africa

Equatorial Guinea
Annobón:  1641–164?/ 1665–16.. (to Portugal)

São Tomé
18 October 1599 – 20 October 1599 / 3 October 1641 – 16 October 1641, nowadays São Tomé and Príncipe

Congo
Loango (Boary) (1648/ –1686/ 1721–1726)
Ngoyo or G'oy

Angola
26 August 1641.- 21/24 August 1648., 
São Paulo de Luanda (Luanda):   Fort Aardenburgh (26 August 1641 – 21/24 August 1648) to Portugal.
São Filipe de Benguela (Benguela): (Sept. 1641 – 1648) to Portugal
Pinda or Mpinda (Sonyo):-at the mouth of the Congo River (1648) to Portugal
Ensandeira island:(at the mouth of the Kwanza river) Fort Mols (1645/6–1648) to Portugal
Malemba (Cabinda)

North America

Settlements of the New Netherland colony, now in the present day U.S. states of:
New York
Connecticut
Pennsylvania
New Jersey
Virginia

Caribbean
St. Maarten
Curaçao
St. Eustatius
Saba
Bonaire
Aves Island
Las Aves
Tobago
St. Croix
Tortuga
Aruba
Anguilla
Tortola c.a.
Jost van Dyke c.a.
Virgin Gorda c.a.
Marie Galante (May 1676)
Grenada (1675)

South America

Brazil
 Maranhao
 Ceara
 Rio Grande do Norte
 Paraiba
 Itamaraca
 Pernambuco
 Alagoas
 Fernando de Noronha
 Bahia

Guyane
Cayenne
Approuague
Oyapoque

Suriname
Paramaribo
Sommelsdijk
Jodensavanne

References

Dutch West India Company
Dutch West India Company Trading Posts
Dutch West India Company Trading Posts